Elena Botchorichvili is a Georgian-Canadian writer, known for her books The Butterfly Drawer (1999), Opera (2002), and Faïna (2007). She was awarded the Russian Prize in 2015.

References 

Living people
20th-century Canadian women writers
21st-century Canadian women writers
Year of birth missing (living people)